Year 1212 (MCCXII) was a leap year starting on Sunday (link will display the full calendar) of the Julian calendar.

Events

By place

England 
 July 10 – The Great Fire: The most severe of several early fires of London burns most of the city to the ground; over 3,000 people die, many of them by drowning in the River Thames. According to a contemporary account: "An awful fire broke out on the Southwark side of London Bridge; while it was raging, a fire broke out at the other end also and so hemmed in the numerous crowds who had assembled to help the distressed.  The sufferers, to avoid the flames, threw themselves over the bridge into boats and barges; but many of these sunk, the people crowding into them.".
 King John (Lackland) impounds the revenue of all prelates appointed by bishops, who have deserted him at his excommunication. He remains on good terms, however, with churchmen who stood by him, including Abbot Sampson, who this year bequeaths John his jewels.

Europe 
 Spring – After the fall of Argos the Crusaders complete their conquest of the Morea in southern Greece. The city, along with Nauplia, is given to Otho de la Roche, a Burgundian nobleman, as a fief, along with an income of 400 hyperpyron from Corinth. Meanwhile, the Venetians conquer Crete and evict Enrico Pescatore, a Genoese adventurer and pirate, active in the Mediterranean.
 July 16 – Battle of Las Navas de Tolosa: The Christian forces of King Alfonso VIII (the Noble) decisively defeat the Almohad army (some 30,000 men) led by Caliph Muhammad al-Nasir. The victory gives a further impulse to the Reconquista but this leaves the Kingdom of Castile in a difficult financial position, as numerous soldiers have to be paid by the treasury.
 The Children's Crusade is organized. There are probably two separate movements of young people, both led by shepherd boys, neither of which embark for the Holy Land – but both of which suffer considerable hardship.
 Early Spring – Nicholas leads a group from the Rhineland and crosses the alps into Italy. In August, he arrives with some 7,000 children in Genoa. Nicholas travels to the Papal States where he meets Pope Innocent III.
 June – The 12-year-old Stephen of Cloyes leads a group across France to Vendôme. Attracting a following of over 30,000 adults and children. After arriving in Marseilles the vast majority return home to their families.
 The Teutonic Order builds Bran Castle (or Dietrichstein) in the Burzenland (modern Romania) as a fortified position at the entrance of a mountain pass through which traders can travel. The Teutonic Knights built another five castles, some of them made of stone. Their rapid expansion in Hungary makes the nobility and clergy, who are previously uninterested in those regions, jealous and suspicious.
 December 9 – The 18-year-old Frederick II is crowned King of the Germans at Mainz. Frederick's authority in Germany remains tenuous, and he is recognized only in southern Germany. In the region of northern Germany, the center of Guelph power, his rival Otto IV continues to hold the imperial power despite his excommunication.

Asia 
 Autumn – Genghis Khan invades Jin territory and besieges Datong. During the assault, he is wounded by an arrow in his knee and orders a withdrawal for rest and relaxation.

By topic

Literature 
 Kamo no Chōmei, a Japanese poet and essayist, writes the Hōjōki, one of the great works of classical Japanese prose.

Religion 
 The contemplative Order of Poor Clares is founded by Clare of Assisi (approximate date).
 The Papal Interdict (see 1208) laid on England and Wales by Innocent III remains in force.

Births 
 March 22 – Go-Horikawa, emperor of Japan (d. 1234)
 May 6 – Constance, margravine of Meissen (d. 1243)
 July 9 – Muiz ud-Din Bahram, Indian ruler (d. 1242)
 Abu al-Hasan al-Shushtari, Andalusian poet (d. 1269)
 Farinata degli Uberti, Italian military leader (d. 1264)
 Ibn Sahl of Seville, Almohad poet and writer (d. 1251)
 Isabella II, queen and regent of Jerusalem (d. 1228)
 Malatesta da Verucchio, Italian nobleman (d. 1312)
 Maria of Chernigov, Kievan Rus' princess (d. 1271)
 Yolande of Dreux, French noblewoman (d. 1248)
 Zita (or Sitha), Italian maid and saint (d. 1272)

Deaths 
 February 2 – Bernhard III, German nobleman (b. 1140)
 February 29 – Hōnen, Japanese Buddhist reformer (b. 1133)
 April 6 – Bertram of Metz (or Berthold), German bishop
 April 15 – Vsevolod III, Grand Prince of Kiev (b. 1154)
 May 24 – Dagmar of Bohemia, queen of Denmark
 July 15 – John I (or Johann), German archbishop 
 July 16 – William de Brus, Scottish lord of Annandale
 August 11 – Beatrice, Holy Roman Empress (b. 1198)
 August 26 – Michael IV, patriarch of Constantinople 
 September 19 – Henry fitz Ailwin, Lord Mayor of London
 October 9 – Philip I (the Noble), Flemish nobleman 
 October 25 – John Comyn, English archbishop (b. 1150)
 November 4 – Felix of Valois, French hermit (b. 1127)
 December 5 – Dirk van Are, bishop and lord of Utrecht
 December 12 – Geoffrey, archbishop of York (b. 1152)
 December 14 – Matilda de Bailleul, Flemish abbess
 Abu al-Abbas al-Jarawi, Moroccan poet and writer
 Anna Komnene Angelina, Nicene empress (b. 1176)
 Azzo VI of Este (or Azzolino), Italian nobleman (b. 1170)
 Baldwin of Béthune, French nobleman and knight
 David Komnenos, emperor of Trebizond (b. 1184)
 Ghiyath al-Din Mahmud, ruler of the Ghurid Empire
 Guillem de Cabestany, Spanish troubadour (b. 1162)
 Henry de Longchamp, English High Sheriff (b. 1150)
 Maria of Montferrat, queen of Jerusalem (b. 1192)
 Peter de Preaux, Norman nobleman and knight
 Robert of Auxerre, French chronicler and writer
 Robert of Shrewsbury, English cleric and bishop
 Walter of Montbéliard, constable of Jerusalem

References